Ranchi Rhinos (abbreviated as RR) was a field hockey team based in Ranchi, Jharkhand that played in the Hockey India League. The team won the inaugural season of Hockey India League defeating Delhi Waveriders by 2-1. It is owned by Patel-Uniexcel Group. South African Gregg Clark is the head coach for the team assisted by Olympian Baljit Singh Saini. German midfielder, two time Olympic champion, Moritz Fürste is the captain of the team. It was dissolved in 2014 after its owners had some dispute with HIL management. It has been replaced by Ranchi Rays.

Franchise Details

Coaching Staff
South African Gregg Clark serves as the head coach for the team who is assisted by Olympian Baljit Singh Saini. The goalkeeping coach of South Africa, David Staniforth, acts as the goalkeeping coach and video analyst for the team. David Ian John of Australia is the exercise physiologist for the team.

Ownership
The team was jointly bought by Patel - PS Group and Uniexcel Group on 14 September 2012.

Team composition

Statistics

Fixtures and Results

2013

 Goals For: 32 (2.29 per match)
 Goals Against: 25 (1.79 per match)
 Most Goals: 10 (Overall: 2nd)
 Mandeep Singh

2014

See also
Hockey India League

References

Hockey India League teams
Sport in Jharkhand
2012 establishments in Jharkhand
Sport in Ranchi
Indian field hockey clubs